Ferdinand Vilhelm Jensen (27 March 1837 – 15 April 1890) was a Danish Historicist architect.

Biography
Jensen was born in Copenhagen on 27 March 1837. He enrolled at the Royal Danish Academy of Fine Arts in 1854, winning the Academy's small silver medal in 1859, the large silver medal in 1860 and finally the small gold medal in 1869.

Jensen's first commissions were the Methodist Jerusalem Church in Copenhagen and several private residential buildings. In the 1870s, he collaborated with architect Vilhelm Petersen (1830–1913) on several projects including Søtorvet for  the Copenhagen Building Company (Det Kjøbenhavnske Bygge-Selskab) . In the beginning of the 1860s, he taught at Copenhagen Technical College and he was building inspector in Frederiksberg from 1869-74. In 1867, he moved to Hamburg where he designed the  gymnasium (Hansehalle) and a number of private homes. In 1882, he returned to Copenhagen where he continued his work for a few years. He died on 15 April 1890 and is buried in Solbjerg Cemetery.

Selected works
 Jerusalem Church, Rigensgade, Copenhagen )1863)
 Brønnum House, Kongens Nytorv, Copenhagen (1866)
 Nivaagaard, Nivå (1880–81)
 Kingosg. 2/Vesterbrogade 106B, Copenhagen (1884–86)
 Bredgade 63-65 (1886–87)
 Abel Cathrinesgade 5-11, Copenhagen (1887–88)
 Petersborg, Trianglen, Copenhagen (1888–90)
 Eriksgade 7-9, 11-13, 15, 
 Eskildsgade 33-35, 37, Halmtorvet 44 (1888–90)
 Hansehalle, Hamburg, Germany

With Vilhelm Petersen
 Søtorvet, Copenhagen
 Fr.borggade 43, 54
 Gothersgade 175, 160, Copenhagen
 Nørre Søgade 5-7, Copenhagen
 Vendersgade 33, 28, Copenhagen

References

External links

 Ferdinand Vilhelm Jensen at Kunstindeks Danmark

Architects from Copenhagen
1837 births
1890 deaths
Royal Danish Academy of Fine Arts alumni
19th-century Danish architects